The big pocket gopher (Heterogeomys lanius) is a species of rodent in the family Geomyidae. It is endemic to Veracruz state in eastern Mexico.

Some authors classify it in the genus Orthogeomys, but recent research has allowed this and its related species to be classified in the genus Heterogeomys.

References

Big pocket gopher
Endemic mammals of Mexico
Natural history of Veracruz
Rodents of North America
Big pocket gopher
Critically endangered biota of Mexico
Critically endangered fauna of North America
Taxonomy articles created by Polbot
Taxobox binomials not recognized by IUCN